Erinaldo Rabelo Santos, better known as Pará (born September 19, 1987 in Rio Maria), is a Brazilian footballer who acts as left back. Currently playing for São Bernardo.

Career
Pará began his career in 2004 working in the youth has faded. Soon after this, the following year, he moved to Sao Caetano where he started working as a professional.
                                                                                                                      
He spent time on loan at Union and St. John to reach the Uniclinic Bragantino, where he had an appearance on the national scene. He was then loaned to Vasco da Gama and, soon after, to Paraná.

For the second half of the 2010 season, was announced as strengthening Avaí.

Career statistics
(Correct )

Honours
Vasco da Gama
Campeonato Brasileiro Série B: 2009

São Bernardo
Campeonato Paulista Série A2: 2021

Contract
 Avaí.

References

External links
 ogol.com
 Sambafoot

1987 births
Living people
Brazilian footballers
Campeonato Brasileiro Série A players
Campeonato Brasileiro Série B players
Campeonato Brasileiro Série C players
Associação Desportiva São Caetano players
Clube Atlético Bragantino players
CR Vasco da Gama players
Paraná Clube players
Avaí FC players
América Futebol Clube (MG) players
Joinville Esporte Clube players
Clube Atlético Penapolense players
Esporte Clube Juventude players
Grêmio Esportivo Brasil players
São Bernardo Futebol Clube players
Association football defenders